The Maricopa or Piipaash are a Native American tribe, who live in the Salt River Pima-Maricopa Indian Community and Gila River Indian Community along with the Pima, a tribe with whom the Maricopa have long held a positive relationship. The Maricopa at the Salt River Pima-Maricopa Indian Community consist mostly of Xalychidom Piipaash members and are concentrated in Lehi. The Maricopa at the Gila River Indian Community are concentrated in Maricopa Colony. The Maricopa are a River Yuman group, formerly living along the banks of the Colorado River.

Names 
The neighboring Akimel O'odham (Pima) and future allies, called these people the Kokmalik'op ('enemies in the big mountains'),. The Spanish transliterated this to Maricopa. They call themselves Piipaa, Piipaash or Pee-Posh ('people'). Many descendants of the Halchidhoma, who had sought refuge at the Maricopa in 1825, today identify in English as Maricopa. But some also identify traditionally as Xalychidom Piipaa or Xalychidom Piipaash ('people who live toward the water').

History

They formerly consisted of small groups of people who lived for generations along the banks of the Colorado River. In the 16th century, they migrated to the area around the Gila River, to avoid attacks by the Quechan and Mojave peoples. During the 1840s, epidemics of new infectious diseases took a toll on the tribe.

In 1825 a party of American trappers, James Ohio Pattie among them, massacred a group of 200 Maricopa in revenge for an earlier attack.

In the 19th century, the Maricopa formed a confederation with the Pima, and in 1857 they successfully defeated the Quechan and Mojave at the Battle of Pima Butte near Maricopa Wells. They became successful farmers, and in 1870, they produced three million pounds of wheat. Drought and water diversion by non-Indians brought widespread crop failures.

In the 19th and the 20th centuries, the Bureau of Indian Affairs implemented policies to try to assimilate the Maricopa into mainstream European-American society, and they brought Presbyterian missionaries into the communities. In 1914, the US federal government broke up communal tribal landholdings for distribution as individual allotments in order to encourage subsistence farming according to the European-American model. It was not appropriate for the geography and climate here. The Pima Advisory Council was formed by the BIA in 1926 to speak on behalf of the Pima and Maricopa communities. Following congressional passage of the Indian Reorganization Act of 1934, in 1936 the Pima and Maricopa agreed on a constitution to restore some measure of self-governance.

Through the 1930s, surface flow on the Gila River was reduced to nothing, and the tribe suffered greatly due to the loss of their river. But the BIA ignored water issues. The tribe resorted to using brackish well water, but it would not support growing edible crops. They began to cultivate cotton as a commodity crop.

Language
Their heritage language is Maricopa, which belongs to the Yuman language family.

Arts

The Maricopa are known for their basket weaving and textiles, in particular, for their highly burnished red-on-redware pottery. Their traditional pottery practices enjoyed a revival from 1937 to 1940. Elizabeth Hart, a US Home Extension Agent, worked with a leading Maricopa potter, Ida Redbird, to form the Maricopa Pottery Cooperative. Redbird served as president of the cooperative, which had 17 to 19 master potters. Hart encouraged members to sign their work. Swastikas were a common traditional motif that was abandoned in the 1940s, due to the Nazi usurpation of the symbol. The paddle and anvil method of construction is used, and, while utilitarian cookware is tempered, decorative Maricopa pottery has no temper.

Notable Maricopa
 Ida Redbird (1892–1971) – Master potter of the Maricopa; instrumental in the 1937–1940 Maricopa pottery revival; first president of Maricopa Pottery Makers Association; translator and informant for Leslie Spier's Yuma Tribes of the Gila River, thus helping to preserve her American Indian heritage.
 Robert "Tree" Cody – flutist. He is also an enrolled member of the Hunkpapa tribe.

See also

 Halchidhoma, a band that joined the Maricopa

Footnotes

Further reading
 Pritzker, Barry. A Native American Encyclopedia. Oxford: Oxford University Press, 1998. 
 Zappia, Natale A. Traders and Raiders: The Indigenous World of the Colorado Basin, 1540–1859. Chapel Hill, NC: University of North Carolina Press, 2014. 
 Vogel, Lindsey Lianne  Forty Years Later: A Reexamination of Maricopa Pottery Arizona State University, 2010.

External links

 Salt River Pima–Maricopa Indian Community page on the Maricopa people

Native American tribes in Arizona